The Nagaland Zoological Park is a  zoo located at Rangapahar in the Chümoukedima District of Nagaland. It is Nagaland's biggest zoo and was opened to public in August 2008.

Gallery

References

External links

Nagaland Zoological Park Official website

Tourist attractions in Nagaland
Chümoukedima district
Zoos in Nagaland
2008 establishments in Nagaland
Zoos established in 2008